Cybocephalus nipponicus is a species of beetle in the family Cybocephalidae. It is found in Africa, the Caribbean, Europe and Northern Asia (excluding China), North America, Oceania, and Southern Asia. It can grow to be 1 mm to 1.35 mm in size.

References

Further reading

 
 

Cucujoidea
Articles created by Qbugbot
Beetles described in 1971